This is an episode list for the BBC television sitcom Hi-de-Hi! by Jimmy Perry and David Croft broadcast between 1 January 1980 and 30 January 1988.

Series overview

Episodes

Pilot (1980)

Series One (1981)

Series Two (1981–1982)

Series Three (1982)

Series Four (1982–1983)

Series Five (1983–1984)

Series Six (1984)

Series Seven (1985–1986)

Series Eight (1986)

Series Nine (1987–1988)

Notes

References

External links
List of Hi-de-Hi! episodes at the British Comedy Guide

Lists of British sitcom episodes